Lafayette Township may refer to one of the following places in the State of Illinois:

 Lafayette Township, Coles County, Illinois
 LaFayette Township, Ogle County, Illinois

See also

Lafayette Township (disambiguation)

Illinois township disambiguation pages